Fresco is the sixth studio album recorded by Puerto Rican salsa singer Jerry Rivera released on August 20, 1996. The album received Grammy and Lo Nuestro nominations for Best Tropical Latin Album. The single "Loco de Amor" won a Tropical Award for the songwriter.

Track listing
This information adapted from Allmusic.

Chart performance

Certification

References

1996 albums
Jerry Rivera albums
Sony Discos albums
Albums produced by Sergio George